Patrick or Pat Dodd may refer to:

Patrick Dodd, a singer on The Voice (U.S. season 4)
Patrick Dodd, an editor on Smooth Talk
Pat Dodd, American businessman and politician